Alfred Barton Rendle FRS (19 January 1865 – 11 January 1938) was an English botanist.

Rendle was born in Lewisham to John Samuel and Jane Wilson Rendle.

He was educated in Lewisham where he first became interested in plants, St Olave's Grammar School, Southwark and St John's College, Cambridge. He graduated with a Bachelor of Arts degree from Cambridge and Bachelor of Science from University of London in 1887. He was awarded Master of Arts degree from Cambridge in 1891 and D.Sc. degree from London in 1898. He won scholarships from his school and universities that covered most of the cost of his education and his move from Cambridge to London was prompted by a vacancy for a salaried position as an assistant in the Botanical Department of the British Museum. This made him focus on systematic botany for his career, focusing on gymnosperms, monocotyledons,
and the Apetalae. In 1894 he obtained a lectureship at The Birkbeck Institute, teaching during the evenings.

He was Keeper of Botany at the Natural History Museum from 1906 to 1930, in succession to George Robert Milne Murray.

In 1905, Rendle attended the International Botanical Congress in Vienna, where he was appointed on to the editorial committee for the International Rules of Botanical Nomenclature (now superseded by the International Code of Nomenclature for algae, fungi, and plants and the International Code of Nomenclature for Bacteria) a role which he continued in until 1935.

Rendle published a number of books.  Perhaps the best known of these was The Classification of Flowering Plants, which saw a gap of over 20 years between the publication of its two volumes – the first was published in 1904, but readers had to wait until 1925 for volume two.  This long gap was attributed by Rendle to his "increasing official and non-official duties".  These included acting as botany editor for the Encyclopædia Britannica Eleventh Edition, published in 1911, editor of the Journal of Botany (1924 – 1938), and revising the 7th edition Handbook of British Flora (1924, author G. Bentham).

Rendle was president of the Quekett Microscopical Club from 1916 to 1921 and president of the Linnean Society from 1923 to 1927. he had been a Fellow of the Linnean Society since 1888, and was its secretary 1916 – 1923.

His contemporaries considered that he had a keen sense of duty which he brought to his roles at the British Museum and contribution to the scientific community.  His teaching focused on delivering fundamental knowledge to undergraduates rather than advanced study.

References

Bibliography

Stearn, William T.,The Natural History Museum at South Kensington 
 Books by A.B. Rendle at the Biodiversity Library including Flora of Jamaica coauthored with William Fawcett.

19th-century British botanists
20th-century British botanists
1865 births
1938 deaths
Alumni of St John's College, Cambridge
Employees of the Natural History Museum, London
English botanists
Fellows of the Royal Society
People educated at St Olave's Grammar School
Presidents of the Linnean Society of London
Veitch Memorial Medal recipients